Mississippi Valley State University is a census-designated place in Leflore County, Mississippi, United States. The population at the 2020 census was 805. It is the location of Mississippi Valley State University and is adjacent to Itta Bena.

Demographics

2020 census

Note: the US Census treats Hispanic/Latino as an ethnic category. This table excludes Latinos from the racial categories and assigns them to a separate category. Hispanics/Latinos can be of any race.

2010 Census
As of the 2010 United States Census, there were 1,182 people living in the CDP. The racial makeup of the CDP was 91.5% Black, 4.0% White, 0.1% Native American, 1.5% Asian, 0.4% from some other race and 1.6% from two or more races. 0.9% were Hispanic or Latino of any race.

Education
MVSU includes faculty and staff apartments and other residential apartments. Dependent children living in these units are within the Greenwood-Leflore School District. These apartments were formerly served by the Leflore County School District. Effective July 1, 2019 this district consolidated into the Greenwood-Leflore School District.

References

Census-designated places in Leflore County, Mississippi
Census-designated places in Mississippi
Mississippi Valley State University